The Cabinet Office is a defunct agency of the Government of New South Wales based in Sydney, Australia that operated between 1988 and 2007.

Established on 14 June 1988, the Cabinet Office provided policy advice to the Premier and state Cabinet. The office assisted in the co-ordination of government policy across departments, such as greenhouse emissions, alcohol misuse, and illicit drugs, amongst other issues of political sensitivity.

The office was also responsible for facilitating the work of Cabinet through the provision of secretarial services.

The office was led by Director General, Roger Wilkins, who resigned in 2006. Following Wilkins' resignation and a review of the New South Wales Government inquiry into government administration by Dr Michael Vertigan AC and Nigel Stokes, entitled New South Wales audit of expenditure and assets report or more commonly the Vertigan Report. In 2007, the Cabinet Office was merged with the Premier's Department of New South Wales to form the New South Wales Department of Premier and Cabinet.

See also
Department of Premier and Cabinet (New South Wales)
List of New South Wales government agencies

References

Further reading
Cabinet Office 2004–5 Annual Report

Cabinet Office
1988 establishments in Australia
2007 disestablishments in Australia
Government agencies established in 1988
Government agencies disestablished in 2007